Rottendorf is a municipality in the district of Würzburg in Bavaria, Germany.

History
As part of the bishopric Würzburg (Stift Haug) Rottendorf was secularisized 1803 in support of Bavaria, then Archduke Ferdinand gave it 1805 from Preßburg in peace for the formation of the grand duchy Würzburg, with which it passed to Bavaria in 1814 finally.

References

Würzburg (district)